Maya Valentinovna Usova (born 22 May 1964) is a Russian former ice dancer. With Alexander Zhulin, she is a two-time Olympic medalist (1994 silver, 1992 bronze), the 1993 World champion, and the 1993 European champion. They also won gold medals at Skate America, NHK Trophy, Nations Cup, and Winter Universiade. They represented the Soviet Union, the Unified Team, and Russia.

Career 
Maya Usova initially competed with Alexei Batalov. At the age of nine, she moved from Gorky to Moscow to train with coach Natalia Dubova. Dubova paired her with Alexander Zhulin in 1980. In 1988, they made their first appearance at the European Championships, placing fourth. The next season, they won silver at the 1989 European Championships in Birmingham, England and silver in their World Championships debut, in Paris.  They maintained their silver medal standing in the world with a silver at the 1990 European Figure Skating Championships, but for the first time dropped behind the Duchesnays to third at the 1990 World Figure Skating Championships in Halifax.

After being third again at the 1991 European Figure Skating Championships, they looked poised for the big breakthrough, for the first time leading their teammates Klimova & Ponomarenko after the compulsories, then leading both the Duchesnays and Klimova & Ponomarenko into the free dance at the 1991 World Figure Skating Championships.  However the top 3 teams were so close the final finish of the free dance order would determine the final results.  Maya Usova & Alexander Zhulin skated a strong free dance that seemed to ensure the title, but had drawn first in the final flight, and received a wide spread of marks from the judges.  Despite receiving four first place ordinals in the free dance, a strange ordinal situation caused them to place third in the free dance and drop from first to third in the end.

In the 1991–92 season, Usova/Zhulin won silver at the 1992 European Championships in Lausanne, Switzerland and then captured their first Olympic medal, bronze, at the 1992 Winter Olympics in Albertville, France. Usova/Zhulin ended their season with a controversial silver at the 1992 World Championships in Oakland, California despite a fall in the free dance.  They moved with Dubova from Moscow to Lake Placid, New York in September 1992.

In the 1992–93 season, Usova/Zhulin won the 1993 European Championships in Helsinki and the 1993 World Championships in Prague.  This was a commanding victory as they won all four phases of the competition at both events, and received straight first place ordinals, apart from losing two first place ordinals to the up-and-coming Russians Anjelika Krylova & Vladimir Fedorov at Worlds.

The next season, they were third at the 1994 European Championships in Copenhagen, behind Jayne Torvill / Christopher Dean and Oksana Grishuk / Evgeni Platov.  They appeared to have the gold medal won as they entered the free dance tied for first with Torvill & Dean, and Grishuk & Platov were mathematically out of contention for the gold medal entering the free dance.  However the free dance of Grishuk & Platov which handily won that phase changed the ordinals, and Usova & Zhulin were pushed to third in the free dance behind Torvill & Dean and dropped to third overall.  They were heavily criticized for their new free program which was said by critics to lack speed and be too far a departure from their usual sensual and elegant style of dancing.

At the 1994 Winter Olympics in Lillehammer, Norway, they won the silver medal behind Grishuk/Platov.  They entered the free dance tied for first with Torvill & Dean, with Grishuk & Platov in third, but with all 3 teams in contention for the gold by winning the free dance.  T.hey lost gold by the majority rule, Grishuk & Platov having the five first place ordinals they needed to win the free dance.  After the loss Usova & Zhulin withdrew from the 1994 World Figure Skating Championships, where they had planned to end their amateur career and immediately went professional.

Usova/Zhulin skated together professionally from 1994 to 1997. They toured with Champions on Ice and won the World Professional Championships. From 1998 to 2000, Usova performed with former rival, Evgeni Platov. Coach Tatiana Tarasova discussed the challenges of pairing Platov, in prime competitive shape, with Usova, a long-time smoker who was nearing retirement. She designed their programs to include many lifts, where Platov was carrying Usova around the ice. Their career started out with mixed results, with marks as low as 4.5 at the Canadian Open, but also an upset win at the World Professional Championships. After last-place finishes in nearly all events in 1999 and 2000, Usova & Platov ceased competing.

From 2002 to 2004, Usova was an assistant coach to Tatiana Tarasova and Platov, working with Galit Chait / Sergei Sakhnovsky and Shizuka Arakawa. She has coached at the Igloo in Mt. Laurel, New Jersey and Odintsovo, near Moscow. She is an International Technical Specialist for Russia.

Personal life 
Usova and Zhulin were married in 1986 but later divorced. Zhulin claimed that their marriage was a sham to get a free apartment from the Soviet government, though Usova denied this claim. In 1992, Usova was charged with assault and battery for attacking rival Oksana Grishuk at a Spago restaurant in Los Angeles.  Following their loss at the Olympics and subsequent divorce, Usova fell into a deep depression. According to television interviews she gave, Usova was hospitalized 17 times for depression. Without a partner, Usova began stalking rival Grishuk at her training rink in Marlboro, Massachusetts, blocking Grishuk's entrance to the rink while smoking cigarettes and muttering curse words. 

Usova is remarried to a Russian professor in medicine, Anatoly Orletsky. In 2010, she gave birth to their daughter, Anastasia. Off the ice, she has appeared in several Marlboro advertisements in Russia.

Programs

With Zhulin

With Platov

Results

Amateur career 
With Zhulin for the Soviet Union (URS), Commonwealth of Independent States (CIS), Unified Team at the Olympics (EUN), and Russia (RUS):

Post-eligible career

References

External links 

Care to Ice Dance? - Usova & Zhulin
Maya Usova

Navigation 

1964 births
Living people
Russian female ice dancers
Soviet female ice dancers
Sportspeople from Nizhny Novgorod
Russian emigrants to the United States
Olympic figure skaters of the Unified Team
Olympic figure skaters of Russia
Figure skaters at the 1992 Winter Olympics
Figure skaters at the 1994 Winter Olympics
Olympic silver medalists for Russia
Olympic bronze medalists for the Unified Team
Olympic medalists in figure skating
World Figure Skating Championships medalists
European Figure Skating Championships medalists
Medalists at the 1992 Winter Olympics
Medalists at the 1994 Winter Olympics
Universiade medalists in figure skating
Goodwill Games medalists in figure skating
Universiade gold medalists for the Soviet Union
Universiade silver medalists for the Soviet Union
Competitors at the 1985 Winter Universiade
Competitors at the 1987 Winter Universiade
Competitors at the 1990 Goodwill Games